"Tu Favorito" is the first EP of Los Favoritos, a musical group formed by different participants of the reality show "Objetivo Fama". Directed by Francisco Zamora and produced by Guillermo Torres, this extended play release on November 18, 2008 on format VMP.

Background
It is the first musical production in the digital format known as the "Virtual Music Production (VMP)" (invented by Guillermo Torres).

Since Tuesday November 25, 2008, the production, which features nine unreleased tracks, it was available exclusively through cell phones preloaded with music content.

The music producer Guillermo Torres, manager of the initiative, acknowledged at a news conference that the dissemination strategy is risky, but it represents a business visionary mind, as well as being attuned to the demands of the young audience to whom it is addressed the concept of "Los Favoritos".

The music of "Los Favoritos" was available in models of cellular Samsung E215 and E251, in the cellular company "Claro". The phone was given away, with contracts for $39.99 or more in a package that also included two tickets for the concert of the group.

Although he was given priority to customers who buy those telephones, it was noted that later will open the sale of tickets for general public.

Track listing
"Solo Herido por tu Amor" - Arquímides González
"Chicas nos Vamos pa' la Fiesta" - Mary Ann Acevedo
"Cómo Decirte" - Ediberto Carmenatty
"Siente el Ritmo" - Jometh Andujar
"Por si de Amor se Trata" - Jonathan Ríos
"Tan sólo Imaginarte" - Blanca Rosa
"Te Voy a Conquistar" - Francisco Zamora
"Tu Favorito" - Los Favoritos
"Mi Sueño Se Cumple Hoy" - Los Favoritos

References

Spanish-language EPs
Puerto Rican musical groups